Marumunai is a 2014 Indian Tamil-language romantic drama film directed by Mariesh Kumar starring Maruthi and Mrudhula Bhaskar.

Plot

Cast 

Maruthi as Kathir 
Mrudhula Bhaskar as Charumathi
Manobala
M. S. Bhaskar as Kathir's father
Rajendran as a resort owner
 Rajasimman
Cheran Raj 
C. Ranganathan
Bonda Mani
Anjali Devi
Dr. Sharmila as Charu's mother
John Ranjith 
Gana Bala in a special appearance

Production
Mariesh Kumar, who worked as an assistant to K. Bhagyaraj and R. Pandiarajan, and wrote television serials before directing this film. Maruthi worked as an assistant director to Yaar Kannan and Vikraman before becoming an actor. The producers PL Balu and PL Subbu handled film distribution in Salem area. The film was shot in 60 locations in Salem district including Yercaud.

Soundtrack
Songs by debutante Sathyadev, who worked for musician Prem Kumar. The soundtrack is composed of four songs:

"Vazhkaithan" is written and is sung by Gana Bala
"Penne Penne" is written by  Mariesh Kumar and is sung by Silambarasan and Chinmayi
"Kadhal Endru" is written by Piraisoodan and is sung by Velmurugan
 "Ivan Thano Margazhi" is written by Pazhani Bharathi and is sung by Aalap Raju

Release and reception 
Marumunai is released on 28 March 2014.

Malini Mannath of The New Indian Express opined that "Marumunai is an attempt to be different and a promising effort from a debutant". A critic from The Times of India gave the film a rating of two out of five stars and wrote that "Mariesh Kumar succeeds in getting your attention. His problem is he has trouble retaining it for the entire film". A critic from Maalaimalar criticised the title, old age story while praising the songs.

References

External links 
 

2014 films
2014 romantic drama films
Indian romantic drama films
2010s Tamil-language films